Sindoor Aur Bandook is a Hindi action romantic film of Bollywood directed by Vinod Talwar and produced by Anil Singh. This film was released on 22 November 1989 under the banner of Rajput Films Combines.

Plot

Cast
 Hemant Birje
 Rita Bhaduri
 Sumeet Saigal
 Yunus Parvez
 Manik Irani
 Shiva Rindani
 Swapna
 Raj Kiran
 Firoz Irani
 Renu Arya
 Rajender Nath

Soundtrack 
The music direction is by Ajay Swami, and the lead singers are Anuradha Paudwal, Udit Narayan, Alka Yagnik, Kavita Krishnamurthy and Chandrani Mukherji.

"Jeet Gaya Dilwala" - Chandrani Mukherjee
"Meri Aankh Ka Ishara" - Kavita Krishnamurthy
"Tera Pyar Mujhe Kahan Liye Jaaye" - Udit Narayan, Alka Yagnik
"Teri Bandook Hai Souten Meri" - Anuradha Paudwal

References

External links
 

1989 films
1989 action films
1980s Hindi-language films
Indian action films
Hindi-language action films
Indian films about revenge